The Miss Nebraska competition is the pageant that selects the representative for the state of Nebraska in the Miss America pageant.

Steffany Lien of Lincoln was crowned Miss Nebraska 2022 on June 11, 2022 at North Platte HS Performing Arts Center in North Platte. She competed for the title of Miss America 2023 at the Mohegan Sun in Uncasville, Connecticut in December 2022 where she was a Non-finalist Talent winner.

Gallery of past titleholders

Results summary 
The following is a visual summary of the past results of Miss Nebraska titleholders at the national Miss America pageants/competitions. The year in parentheses indicates the year of the national competition during which a placement and/or award was garnered, not the year attached to the contestant's state title.

Placements 
 Miss America: Teresa Scanlan (2011)
 Top 10: Mary Lee Jepsen (1963), Guylyn Remmenga (1979), Kristin Lowenberg (1984), Brittany Jeffers (2010), Jessica Shultis (2019)
 Top 12: Alyssa Howell (2016)
 Top 15: Myrtle Roach (1925)
 Top 20: Christina Foehlinger (2002)

Awards

Preliminary awards
 Preliminary Lifestyle and Fitness: Molly McGrath (2007)
 Preliminary Talent: Diane Knotek (1957), Mary Lee Jepsen (1963) (tie), Guylyn Remmenga (1979) (tie), Teresa Scanlan (2011)

Non-finalist awards
 Non-finalist Talent: Madalyn Joyce King (1947), Diane Knotek (1957), Katherine L. Nielsen (1958), Sherry Johnson (1959), Patricia Lee Van Horne (1967), Linda Kay Hallstrom (1978), Paula Louise Mitchell (1981), Allison Boyd (1985), Julie Meusburger (1986), Vicki Linn Train (1992), Myra Katherine Hale (1996), Kendra Quandt (1998), Jane Noseworthy (2004), Kayla Batt (2012), Steffany Lien (2023)
 Non-finalist Interview: Jill Pennington (2001), Aleah Peters (2017)

Other awards
 Miss Congeniality: Jane Deliese Briggeman (1970), Kayla Batt (2012)
 Quality of Life Award 1st runners-up: Kendra Quandt (1998)
 Quality of Life Award 2nd runners-up: Myra Katherine Hale (1996)
 Quality of Life Award Finalists: Vicki Linn Train (1992)
 STEM Scholarship Award Finalists: Allison Tietjen (2018)
 Tiffany Phillips Scholar-Athlete Scholarship: Allie Swanson (2020)
Women in Business 1st runner-up: Morgan Holen (2022)
 Women in Business Scholarship Award Finalists: Jessica Shultis (2019)

Winners

References

External links
 Miss Nebraska official website

Nebraska
Nebraska culture
Women in Nebraska
Annual events in Nebraska